Bertha Crowther (9 December 1921 – 8 August 2007) was a British athlete. She competed in the women's 80 metres hurdles at the 1948 Summer Olympics.

She represented England and won a silver medal in the high jump at the 1950 British Empire Games in Auckland, New Zealand. She also competed in the javelin, long jump and 80 metres hurdles.

References

External links
 

1921 births
2007 deaths
Athletes (track and field) at the 1948 Summer Olympics
British female hurdlers
British female high jumpers
Olympic athletes of Great Britain
Athletes (track and field) at the 1950 British Empire Games
Commonwealth Games silver medallists for England
Commonwealth Games medallists in athletics
Place of birth missing
Medallists at the 1950 British Empire Games